Crambus sargentellus is a moth in the family Crambidae. It was described by Alexander Barrett Klots in 1942. It is found in the US states of Arizona and New Mexico.

The length of the forewings is 13-17.3 mm. The ground color of the forewings is pale brownish yellow, but lighter towards the inner margin. The hindwings are pale, grayish brown, rather thinly scaled.

Etymology
The species is named for Dr. William D. Sargent of the College of the City of New York.

References

Crambini
Moths described in 1942
Moths of North America